Berteroa, the false madworts, is a genus of flowering plants of the family Brassicaceae, native to temperate Eurasia. Its best known member is the weedy invasive hoary alyssum, Berteroa incana.

Systematics
Species currently considered valid by The Plant List are as follows: 
Berteroa gintlii Rohlena
Berteroa incana (L.) DC.
Berteroa mutabilis (Vent.) DC.
Berteroa obliqua (Sm.) DC.
Berteroa orbiculata DC.

References

 
Brassicaceae genera